Mullusoge  is a village in the southern state of Karnataka, India. It is located in the Kushalanagar taluk of Kodagu district.

Demographics
 India census, Mullusoge had a population of 5864 with 2921 males and 2943 females.

See also
 Kodagu
 Mangalore
 Districts of Karnataka

References

External links
 http://Kodagu.nic.in/

Villages in Kodagu district